Cantillation is the ritual chanting of prayers and responses. It often specifically refers to Jewish Hebrew cantillation. Cantillation sometimes refers to diacritics used in texts that are to be chanted in liturgy.

Cantillation includes:
 Chant
 Byzantine chant
 Gallican chant
 Gregorian chant
 Old Roman chant
 Syriac chant
Vedic chant
 Hebrew cantillation
 Vietnamese cantillation
 Tajwid (recitation of the Quran)

References

Chants